Narmand (also Romanized as Nārmand) is a village in Fareghan Rural District, Fareghan District, Hajjiabad County, Hormozgan Province, Iran. At the 2006 census, its population was 129, in 41 families.

References 

Populated places in Hajjiabad County